Perona is a surname. Notable people with the surname include:

 Bernard Perona, American author
 Joaquín Navarro Perona (1921–2002), Spanish footballer
 John Perona, Italian-American nightclub owner
 Pietro Perona, Italian-American engineering professor, co-author of anisotropic diffusion
 Renato Perona, Italian cyclist

See also
 Perona, a character in One Piece
 8230 Perona, an asteroid